The 2016 Rangitikei mayoral election were part of the Rangitikei and wider New Zealand local elections. On 8 October 2016, elections were held for the Mayor of Rangitikei and other local government roles. Incumbent mayor Andy Watson was first elected in 2013 with 41.5% of the vote. Watson announced on 9 June he is running for a second term as mayor. Running against Watson are community patrol chair George London and civil engineer Robert Snijders, all three from Marton.

Dates
Following are the key dates for the mayoral election:

Candidates
Incumbent mayor Andy Watson announced on 9 June his intention to run for a second term.

On 9 August candidates George London and Robert Snijders came forward. London is a Queen's Service Medal recipient, given to him for his services to the community; he is a volunteer health shuttle driver for St John Ambulance since 2009 and was elected chairman of the Marton Community Patrol in June 2015.

Snijders is a civil engineer and the new owner of the Old Granary in Marton since July 2016; Snijders and his wife aim to restore the building—a Heritage New Zealand Category II building—which had burnt down in March 2013.

Campaign
On 28 July, as no other candidates had yet come forward, mayor Watson encouraged other candidates to stand for the mayoral election saying "It would be poor democracy if there were no more names put forward". Watson voiced his drive as being the number of projects he had initiated that he wanted to see through, and the district being faced with fairly major challenges around earthquake infrastructure.

Snijder's view on the council is that "it needed to be more engaged with the community". Snijder has been a civil engineer working in Libya, Russia and England doing urban rejuvenation. "With my construction background I feel I'm more than qualified to step in and provide advice and expertise on costs and how to improve the proposed design [of new proposed centres in Bulls, Marton and Taihape]." In addition, Snijder aims to increase tourism in the area.

London, a resident in Marton for 16 years and chair of the Marton Community Patrol, has said the council "needs a 'stronger' leader". Further adding: "I don't think there's a strong enough council there at the moment. They're a bit shy, a bit quiet and I want to be a bit louder and get out there more".

Results
The results were released on 31 October 2016.

See also
2016 Rangitikei local elections
2016 New Zealand local elections

References

External links
2016 elections information on the Rangitikei District Council website
2016 elections information on the Electoral Commission website

Rangitikei
Politics of Rangitikei
Rangitikei